Vincent Cronin (born 1943) was an Irish Gaelic footballer who played as a left corner-back at senior level for the Cork county team.

Born in Togher, Cork, Cronin first played competitive football in his youth. He arrived on the inter-county scene at the age of seventeen when he first linked up with the Cork minor team, before later joining the under-21 side. He made his senior debut during the 1963 championship. Cronin played championship football for just one season. He was a Munster runner-up on one occasion.

At club level Cronin played with St Finbarr's.

Throughout his inter-county career, Cronin made just one championship appearance for Cork.

Honours
Cork
All-Ireland Minor Football Championship (1): 1961
Munster Minor Football Championship (2): 1960, 1961

References

1943 births
Living people
Cork inter-county Gaelic footballers
St Finbarr's Gaelic footballers